Proto-Dravidian is the linguistic reconstruction of the common ancestor of the Dravidian languages. It is thought to have differentiated into Proto-North Dravidian, Proto-Central Dravidian, and Proto-South Dravidian, although the date of diversification is still debated.

History

As a proto-language, Proto-Dravidian is not itself attested in historical records. Its modern conception is based solely on reconstruction. It is suggested that the language was spoken in the 4th millennium BCE, and started disintegrating into various branches around 3rd-millennium BCE.

The origin and territory of the Proto-Dravidian speakers is uncertain, but some suggestions have been made based on the reconstructed Proto-Dravidian vocabulary. The reconstruction has been done on the basis of cognate words present in the different branches (Northern, Central and Southern) of the Dravidian language family.

For the Southern Dravidians, this region extends from Saurashtra and Central India to South India. It thus represents the general area in which the Dravidians were living before the separation of branches. 

According to Franklin Southworth (2005), the Proto-Dravidian vocabulary is characteristic of a rural economy based on agriculture, animal husbandry and hunting. However, there are some indications of a society more complex than a rural one:

 Words for an upper storey and beam
 Metallurgy
 Trade
 Payment of dues (possibly taxes or contributions to religious ceremonies)
 Social stratification

This evidence is not sufficient to determine with certainty the territory of the Proto-Dravidians. These characteristics can be accommodated within multiple contemporary cultures, including:

 2nd and 3rd millennium BCE Neolithic-Chalcolithic cultures of Elam and Mehrgarh and present-day western Rajasthan, Deccan and other parts of the peninsula.
 Early Indus Valley civilisation sites in Pakistan and later ones in the Saurashtra (Sorath) area of present-day Gujarat.
 Asko Parpola identifies Proto-North Dravidians with the Indus Valley civilization (IVC) and the Meluhha people mentioned in Sumerian records, and has suggested that the word "Meluhha" derives from the Dravidian words mel(u)-akam ("highland country, high abode").
 Loan words identified in Sumerian such as the words for ivory and sesame are considered to be derived from Proto-Dravidian and spread from IVC to Mesopotamia due to trade.

Phonology

Vowels
Proto-Dravidian contrasted between five short and long vowels: *a, *ā, *i, *ī, *u, *ū, *e, *ē, *o, *ō. The sequences *ai and *au are treated as *ay and *av (or *aw).

Consonants
Proto-Dravidian has been reconstructed as having the following consonant phonemes:

The alveolar stop *ṯ developed into an alveolar trill  in many daughter languages. The stop sound is retained in Kota and Toda. Malayalam and Sri Lankan Tamil still retains the original (alveolar) stop sound in gemination (ibid) and after a nasal. In Old Tamil it took the enunciative vowel -u like the other stops. In other words, *ṯ (or *ṟ) did not occur word-finally without the enunciative vowel.

Velar nasal *ṅ occurred only before *k in Proto-Dravidian (as in many of its daughter languages). Therefore, it is not considered a separate phoneme in Proto-Dravidian. However, it attained phonemic status in languages like Malayalam, Gondi, Konda and Pengo because the original sequence *ṅk was simplified to *ṅ or *ṅṅ.

The Northern Dravidian languages Kurukh, Malto and Brahui cannot easily be derived from the traditional Proto-Dravidian phonological system.  proposes that they branched off from an earlier stage of Proto-Dravidian than the conventional reconstruction, which would apply only to the other languages. He suggests reconstructing a richer system of dorsal stop consonants:

Numerals

Vocabulary

Crop plants
In some cases, the proto-form glosses differ from the species identified from archaeological sites. For example, the two Southern Neolithic staple grasses Brachiaria ramosa and Setaria verticillata respectively correspond to the reconstructed Proto-Dravidian forms for Sorghum vulgare and Setaria italica as early Dravidian speakers shifted to millet species that were later introduced to South India.

Basic vocabulary
Basic vocabulary of Proto-Dravidian selected from :

See also

Elamo-Dravidian languages
Dravidian languages
Sanskrit

References

Works cited

Further reading

 
 
 
 
 .

External links
 

Dravidian
Pre-Indo-Europeans